Terry Molloy (born 4 January 1947) is an English actor. He is known predominantly for his work on radio and television, especially his portrayal of Davros, creator of the Daleks, in the BBC television science fiction series Doctor Who.

Career 
Molloy has been a member of the cast of BBC Radio 4's The Archers playing Mike Tucker since 1974 and has won awards for his work as an actor on radio. In 1980 he performed in the Radio 4 adaptation of Nicholas Monsarrat's war novel The Cruel Sea.

On television, Molloy is known for becoming the third actor to play the mad scientist Davros, the creator of the Daleks, in the long-running science fiction series Doctor Who. He appeared in the stories Resurrection of the Daleks (1984), Revelation of the Daleks (1985) and Remembrance of the Daleks (1988), becoming the first actor to play the role in different stories. Molloy was initially cast in the role by director Matthew Robinson, who had worked with him before and thought his talent for voices would be ideal to recreate the part first played by Michael Wisher. Molloy also appeared in the Doctor Who story Attack of the Cybermen (1985) as an undercover policeman named Russell, again cast by Robinson. In recent years, Molloy has reprised the role of Davros in the Big Finish Productions audio dramas Davros, The Juggernauts, Terror Firma, Masters of War, The Davros Mission, The Curse of Davros, and the four-part miniseries I, Davros. He also played Davros in a 2005 stage production, The Trial of Davros. Molloy also took over the role of Stan Harvey in the ITV soap opera Crossroads from Edward Clayton when Stan made a brief visit to the motel in 1987.

Molloy regularly attends Doctor Who conventions and events, where he meets fans and speaks about his time on the programme. He has also appeared on BBC 7 (now Radio4extra) in the role of Professor Edward Dunning opposite fellow Doctor Who actor Nicholas Courtney in The Scarifyers audio series, co-written by Paul Morris and Simon Barnard for Cosmic Hobo Productions. Molloy also recorded a short cameo, as Davros for the live Doctor Who podcast stage show, 50 Years of Doctor Who: Preachrs Podcast Live 2. He appeared in this alongside a mix of modern and classic Doctor Who actors including; Nicholas Briggs, Richard Franklin, Simon Fisher Becker and Peter Davison.

Molloy's other TV credits include God's Wonderful Railway, Oliver Twist, The Real Eddy English, Tales of Sherwood Forest, Chalkface, The Bill and Casualty.

In March 2009, he appeared as 'Eric Clapton' on Harry Hill's TV Burp, a reference to his guest role on Casualty a week earlier, after Hill noted his likeness to the singer.

Personal life 
In 1970, Mollloy married Heather Barrett. They had three children: daughter Hannah and sons Robert and Philip. He is now married to Victoria Smillie, whom he married in 2005.

Molloy currently lives in Bawburgh, near Norwich. In the 1960s, he played baritone saxophone in a soul band, The T-Bunkum Band and appeared at the Cavern Club in Liverpool.

Filmography

Film

References

External links

Terry Molloy's website
Terry Molloy: The Voice Master Part 1
Terry Molloy: The Voice Master Part 2
BBC Norfolk — Watch interview with Terry Molloy discussing I Davros — November '06
BBC Norfolk Online — Davros gallery
BBC Norfolk Online — Terry Molloy interview on playing Davros
BBC Norfolk Online — RealAudio interview with Terry Molloy discussing how he created the voice of Davros
BBC Norfolk Online — RealAudio interview with Terry Molloy discussing being cast as Davros
BBC Norfolk Online — RealAudio interview with Terry Molloy speculating about the return of Davros in Doctor Who
BBC Norfolk Online — RealAudio interview with Terry Molloy discussing the new series of Doctor Who
Mandy Actors website — Terry Molloy
Radio 4 biography

1947 births
Living people
Alumni of Liverpool Hope University
English male radio actors
English male television actors
People from South Norfolk (district)